The 2019 Rally Argentina (also known as the XION Rally Argentina 2019) was a motor racing event for rally cars that held over four days between 25 and 28 April 2019. It marked the thirty-ninth running of Rally Argentina, and was the fifth round of the 2019 World Rally Championship, World Rally Championship-2 and the newly-created WRC-2 Pro class. The 2019 event was based in Villa Carlos Paz in Córdoba Province and consisted of eighteen special stages totalling  competitive kilometres.

Ott Tänak and Martin Järveoja were the defending rally winners. Their team, Toyota Gazoo Racing WRT, were the manufacturers' winners. Pontus Tidemand and Jonas Andersson were the defending winners in the World Rally Championship-2 category, but they did not participate in the event.

Thierry Neuville and Nicolas Gilsoul won the rally for the second time in their career. Their team, Hyundai Shell Mobis WRT, were the manufacturers' winners. The Citroën Total crew of Mads Østberg and Torstein Eriksen won the WRC-2 Pro category, finishing first in the combined WRC-2 category, while the crew of Pedro Heller and Marc Martí won the wider WRC-2 class. Østberg's win marked the first World Championship victory for the R5-spec Citroën C3.

Background

Championship standings prior to the event
Thierry Neuville and Nicolas Gilsoul led both the drivers' and co-drivers' championships by two-points ahead of six-time world champions Sébastien Ogier and Julien Ingrassia.  Ott Tänak and Martin Järveoja were third, a further three points behind. In the World Rally Championship for Manufacturers, Hyundai Shell Mobis WRT held a twelve-point lead over Citroën Total WRT.

In the World Rally Championship-2 Pro standings, Łukasz Pieniążek and Kamil Heller held a twenty-two-point lead ahead of Gus Greensmith and Elliott Edmondson in the drivers' and co-drivers' standings respectively. Kalle Rovanperä and Jonne Halttunen were third, four points further back. In the manufacturers' championship, M-Sport Ford WRT lead Škoda Motorsport by sixty-six points, with Citroën Total eleven points further behind in third.

In the World Rally Championship-2 standings, Ole Christian Veiby and Jonas Andersson led the drivers' and co-drivers' standings by twelve points respectively. Nikolay Gryazin and Yaroslav Fedorov were second, following by Yoann Bonato and Benjamin Boulloud in third.

Entry list
The following crews entered into the rally. The event was open to crews competing in the World Rally Championship, World Rally Championship-2, WRC-2 Pro and privateer entries not registered to score points in any championship. A total of twenty-seven entries were received, with ten crews entered with World Rally Cars and nine entered the World Rally Championship-2. Three crews were nominated to score points in the Pro class.

Route
No major changes are made to the route this year apart from some slight length-reductions to selected stages.

Itinerary
All dates and times are ART (UTC-3).

Report

World Rally Cars
Normally, the road cleaner has to endure the insufficient grip, but this year in Argentina was different — persistent rain over the previous forty-eight hours meant the road was muddy and difficult to drive through for the crews who started down the road order. As a result, championship leader Thierry Neuville grabbed the lead as defending rally winner Ott Tänak lost valuable time with a broken drive shaft. The only casualty of the day was Esapekka Lappi, who was crashed out in the final stage of Friday and forced to retire from the rally.

Coming to the second leg, the battle for the victory was extremely intense until Tänak stopped his Yaris due to an alternator failure in the afternoon loop. Another casualty of the leg was Elfyn Evans, who rolled his Fiesta heavily after smashed a huge rock. As a result, the Welshman was forced to retire from the weekend. Defending world champion Sébastien Ogier lost power steering in the morning loop, while Kris Meeke lost his brakes. Following the drivers ahead suffered issues, Andreas Mikkelsen charged himself to second overall after the oil-leak issue fixed. Eventually, the Hyundai duos managed to bring their team a 1-2 finish. Ogier completed the podium as Meeke receive a ten-second penalty for deviating from the correct route in Saturday morning's speed test.

Classification

Special stages

Championship standings

World Rally Championship-2 Pro
Mads Østberg comfortably led the rally despite a puncture, over four minutes ahead of eighteen-year-old driver Marco Bulacia Wilkinson, who won all three afternoon stages. Gus Greensmith failed to complete the first leg with a broken front suspension. In the end, Østberg comfortably won his second victory of the season, following by Greensmith, who re-join the rally on Saturday. Bulacia Wilkinson rolled his Fabia at the opening stage, which forced to retire from the rally in leg two.

Classification

Special stages
Results in bold denote first in the RC2 class, the class which both the WRC-2 Pro and WRC-2 championships run to.

Championship standings

World Rally Championship-2
The first leg produced four different leaders in progress. Takamoto Katsuta was the first leader, but a puncture and broken wheel rim deposited his Fiesta into a ditch; Kajetan Kajetanowicz was the second leader, but he broke his rear suspension after landing heavily over a jump; Alberto Heller was the third leader, but he stopped in the penultimate test when his Fiesta's engine auxiliary belt broke. Eventually, the fourth leader Pedro Heller topped the category by almost six minutes after a day of attrition. Having a trouble-free Saturday, Pedro took the victory after overcame a big scare that the car stopped less than one kilometer from the finish of the iconic El Condór special stage.

Classification

Special stages
Results in bold denote first in the RC2 class, the class which both the WRC-2 Pro and WRC-2 championships run to.

Championship standings

Notes

References

External links
  
 2019 Rally Argentina in e-wrc website
 The official website of the World Rally Championship

Argentina
2019 in Argentine motorsport
April 2019 sports events in South America
2019